Pablo Montes is the name of:

 Pablo Montes (athlete) (1945–2008), Cuban sprinter
 Pablo Montes (footballer) (born 1985), Honduran footballer
 Pablo Montes, fictional character in the novel Servant of the Bones